Lewis County Schools is the operating school district within Lewis County, West Virginia. It is governed by the Lewis County Board of Education, located in Weston.

Schools

High school
Lewis County High School

Middle school
 Robert L. Bland Middle School

Elementary schools
 Leading Creek Elementary School
 Jane Lew Elementary School
 Peterson-Central Elementary School
 Roanoke Elementary School

Controversies
In 2006, the West Virginia Human Rights Commission investigated charges that a preschool teacher at Peterson-Central Elementary School, used a biracial child as a lesson prop and told schoolmates that the child had been adopted. Joseph Mace, superintendent of Lewis County schools, refused to return phone calls and e-mails from The Associated Press, but acknowledged the incident to a local television station.

Board of Education
The Lewis County Board of Education is governed by five elected members who serve a four-year term in office. The Board of Education consists of the following elected members:

External links
 Official site

References

School districts in West Virginia
Education in Lewis County, West Virginia